Cristina María Rodríguez (born February 3, 1973) is the Leighton Homer Surbeck Professor of Law at Yale Law School, the school's first tenured Hispanic professor. Before joining the faculty at Yale, Rodríguez was the Deputy Assistant Attorney General for the Office of Legal Counsel within the United States Department of Justice. After earning her JD, she clerked for David S. Tatel of the U.S. Court of Appeals and Sandra Day O'Connor of the U.S. Supreme Court.

Early life and education
Rodríguez was born on February 3, 1973 in San Antonio, Texas. Rodríguez father is from Cuba and her mother is from Puerto Rico. She was raised in a bilingual household before enrolling at Yale College. where she received her Bachelor of Arts degree in history.  Rodríguez then travelled to England where she became a Rhodes Scholar at the University of Oxford while earning her Master of Letters in Modern History. She eventually returned to the United States where she enrolled at Yale Law School for her Juris Doctor and also served as articles editor of the Yale Law Journal. Upon graduating from Yale, Rodríguez became a Reginald F. Lewis Fellow at Harvard Law School during the 2001–02 academic year.

Career
Before joining the faculty at New York University School of Law (NYU) in 2004, Rodríguez clerked for David S. Tatel of the U.S. Court of Appeals and Sandra Day O'Connor of the U.S. Supreme Court. In 2008, Rodríguez joined the Council on Foreign Relations as a five-year term member and later received tenure from NYU.

From 2011 until 2013, Rodríguez was the Deputy Assistant Attorney General for the Office of Legal Counsel within the United States Department of Justice. In January 2013, Rodríguez left her position as the Deputy Assistant Attorney General to become Yale Law School's first tenured Latino faculty member. The following year, she was named as the Leighton Homer Surbeck Professor of Law.

During the COVID-19 pandemic in North America, Rodríguez was recognized by the American Academy of Arts & Sciences for her accomplishments. She was also named as a member of Agency Review Teams during the presidential transition of Joe Biden. On April 9, 2021, Rodríguez was named Co-Chair of the Presidential Commission on the Supreme Court of the United States.

On May 26, 2022, it was reported that Connecticut Supreme Court justice Maria Araújo Kahn and two Yale Law School professors Cristina M. Rodríguez & Justin Driver were possibly being vetting for a vacancy on the United States Court of Appeals for the Second Circuit.

Selected publications
Negotiating Conflict through Federalism (2014)
Immigration, Civil Rights, and the Evolution of the People (2013)
Constraint through Delegation (2010)
The President and Immigration Law (2009, 2020)
The Significance of the Local in Immigration Regulation (2008)

See also 
List of law clerks of the Supreme Court of the United States (Seat 8)

References

1973 births
Living people
American Rhodes Scholars
Fellows of the American Academy of Arts and Sciences
Law clerks of the Supreme Court of the United States
New York University School of Law faculty
People from San Antonio
Yale Law School alumni
Yale Law School faculty